Neftalí Teja Cisneros (born 3 December 1991 in Texcoco, Mexico) is a Mexican former professional footballer who last played for Tampico Madero F.C.

External links
 
 

Living people
1991 births
Association football defenders
Club Universidad Nacional footballers
Alebrijes de Oaxaca players
Liga MX players
Ascenso MX players
People from Texcoco, State of Mexico
Footballers from the State of Mexico
Mexican footballers